Thimig is a German surname, principally associated with an Austrian theatrical family:

 Hans Emil Thimig (1900-1991), son of Hugo Thimig, Austrian stage and film actor
 Helene Thimig, daughter of Hugo Thimig, wife of Max Reinhardt
 Hermann Thimig (1890-1982), son of Hugo Thimig, Austrian stage and film actor
 Hugo August Thimig (1854-1944), actor in Vienna and director of the Burgtheater

German-language surnames
Austrian families
Acting families